The Impatient Years is a 1944 romance film made by Columbia Pictures, directed by Irving Cummings, and written by Virginia Van Upp.

This was the final film Jean Arthur owed Columbia as part of her long contract which included periods of fights with studio boss Harry Cohn and resulted in a number of suspensions.  Arthur was known to be thrilled her contract was over.

Plot
Andy (Lee Bowman) and Janie (Jean Arthur) Anderson are seated on opposite sides of a court room filing for a divorce. As the judge is about to render his verdict, Janie's father (Charles Coburn) makes a suggestion. In an attempt to save the marriage, William suggests that the couple return to San Francisco (where they met a year and a half ago) for four days and retrace all of their steps to include getting married.

Cast
 Jean Arthur as Janie Anderson
 Lee Bowman as Andy Anderson
 Charles Coburn as William Smith
 Edgar Buchanan as Judge
 Charley Grapewin as Benjamin L. Pidgeon, Bellboy
 Phil Brown as Henry Fairchild
 Harry Davenport as Minister
 Jane Darwell as Minister's Wife
 Grant Mitchell as Hotel Clerk
 Bob Haymes as Singer

Home media
The film is available on DVD as part of the Jean Arthur Comedy Collection, released by Sony Pictures Home Entertainment.

References

External links
 
 
 
 
 

1944 films
1944 romantic comedy films
American romantic comedy films
American black-and-white films
Columbia Pictures films
Films directed by Irving Cummings
Films set in San Francisco
Films set in the San Francisco Bay Area
Films set on the home front during World War II
World War II films made in wartime
1940s English-language films